Robert E. Clifford (October 10, 1913 – January 28, 2006) was an American football player and coach. Following his playing career at Western Colorado University, he served as the head football coach at Colby College in Waterville, Maine from 1956 to 1961 and at the University of Vermont from 1962 to 1969, compiling a career college football coaching record of 60–48–1.

Clifford was raised in New Haven, Connecticut, where he attended Wilbur Cross High School.

Head coaching record

References

1913 births
2006 deaths
Colby Mules football coaches
Northwestern Wildcats football coaches
Vermont Catamounts football coaches
Western Colorado Mountaineers football players
Williams Ephs football coaches
Sportspeople from East Orange, New Jersey
Sportspeople from New Haven, Connecticut
Players of American football from New Haven, Connecticut
Players of American football from New Jersey
Wilbur Cross High School alumni